United Nations Security Council Resolution 22, adopted on April 9, 1947, recommended that the United Kingdom and Albania take their dispute involving the sinking of two British vessels by mines in the Straits of Corfu on October 22, 1946 to the International Court of Justice.

The resolution was adopted by 8 votes, with abstentions from Poland and the Soviet Union. The United Kingdom did not participate in the voting.

See also
 List of United Nations Security Council Resolutions 1 to 100 (1946–1953)
 United Nations Security Council Resolution 19
 Corfu Channel case

References

External links
 

 0022
1947 in the United Kingdom
 0022
 0022
 0022
1947 in Albania
Albania–United Kingdom relations
April 1947 events
Corfu Channel incident